Chandana Ramesh is a politician from the Telugu Desam Party. He is an MLA in the Andhra Pradesh Legislative Assembly representing the Rajahmundry Rural constituency.

References

Telugu Desam Party politicians
Andhra Pradesh MLAs 2009–2014
Year of birth missing (living people)
Place of birth missing (living people)
Living people
People from East Godavari district